Bozab may refer to:

Bozab, Lorestan